Sprites are an independent new wave/indie pop music group from Maryland, United States. Their lineup is ever-changing, with only the founding members (the husband-wife duo of Jason Korzen, formerly of Barcelona, and Amy Korzen) staying constant. Contributors include Christian Scanniello, Ivan Ramiscal, Kevin Alvir, Armin Pruessner, Derek Strausbaugh, and Reid Dossinger.

History

2002 to 2006: Starling, Spiders, Tiger and Sprites
Sprites was formed in 2002 by Jason Korzen following the breakup of Barcelona. The band released Starling, Spiders, Tiger and Sprites in 2003 on March Records. They have done some touring, including a United States tour with The Lucksmiths.

2006: Modern Gameplay
Sprites' second album, Modern Gameplay, was released in August 2006 through Darla Records.

Discography

Albums and EPs
 Starling, Spiders, Tiger and Sprites, 2003, March Records
 Bionic Hands e.p., 2004, Lejos Discos
 Modern Gameplay, 2006, Darla Records

Featured on
 Little Darla Has a Treat for You vol. 19, 2002 ("Following Her Around")
 Teenbeat Sampler, 2003 ("Keep it Together")
 Little Darla Has a Treat for You vol. 24, 2006 ("George Romero")
 Little Darla Has a Treat for You vol. 25, 2006 ("Pac-Man Fever")
 Wish I'd Kept a Scrapbook: A Tribute to Tullycraft, 2010 ("Wish I’d Kept a Scrapbook")

See also
 Barcelona

References

External links
 Official site
 Sprites MySpace
 [ AllMusic Guide Sprites site]

American new wave musical groups
Indie rock musical groups from Maryland
Darla Records artists